Johnny Ellis (March 13, 1960 – February 9, 2022) was an American politician who served as a member of the Alaska Senate from 1992 to 2017. He was previously a member of the Alaska House of Representatives from 1986 through 1992.

Early life and education 
Ellis was born in Springfield, Missouri, and moved to Anchorage, Alaska, in 1975. Ellis was an Eagle Scout. After graduating from Bartlett High School (Anchorage, Alaska) in 1978, he attended the University of Alaska Anchorage for one year before earning a Bachelor of Arts degree from Claremont McKenna College in 1982.

Career 
Ellis served as a member of the Alaska House of Representatives from 1987 to 1993. He was then elected to the Alaska Senate, representing the H district from 1993 to 2003. Ellis represented the L district from 2003 to 2013 and the I district from 2013 to 2017. From 2009 to 2011, Ellis served as majority leader of the Senate. Outside of politics, Ellis was a commissioner of the Western Interstate Commission for Higher Education and operated several small businesses.

Personal life and death 
In 2016, Ellis spoke publicly about his health issues, including battles with prostate cancer, and multiple sclerosis. He also came out as gay.

Ellis died on February 9, 2022, at the age of 61.

References

1960 births
2022 deaths
20th-century American politicians
21st-century American politicians
Democratic Party Alaska state senators
Businesspeople from Anchorage, Alaska
Gay politicians
LGBT people from Missouri
LGBT state legislators in Alaska
Democratic Party members of the Alaska House of Representatives
Politicians from Anchorage, Alaska
Politicians from Springfield, Missouri
University of Alaska Anchorage alumni
Claremont McKenna College alumni